Sharab may refer to:

 Sharab Shiraz
 Lubsan Sharab Tepkin (1875-1941?), Buddhist priest
 the Arabic word for syrup
 Shar'ab as-Salam District, a district in Yemen